is a Japanese filmmaker, screenwriter and video game designer. He has directed several live-action film adaptations of manga and anime, including The Princess Blade (2001), Gantz (2011), I Am a Hero (2015), Bleach (2018), Inuyashiki (2018), and Kingdom (2019).

Filmography

Film

Video on demand

Video game developer

References

External links

1970 births
Japanese film directors
Japanese writers
Japanese screenwriters
Japanese video game designers
Living people
People from Hiroshima Prefecture